is a retrograde irregular satellite of Jupiter. It was discovered by a team of astronomers from the University of Hawaii led by Scott S. Sheppard in 2003.

It belongs to the Carme group, made up of irregular retrograde moons orbiting Jupiter at a distance ranging between 23 and 24 Gm and at an inclination of about 165°.

This moon was once considered lost until November 2020, when the Minor Planet Center announced the recovery of S/2003 J 9 by Scott Sheppard in observations from September 2011 to April 2018.

References

Carme group
Moons of Jupiter
Irregular satellites
Astronomical objects discovered in 2003
Moons with a retrograde orbit